José Francisco Ballesta Germán (born 19 July 1958) is a Spanish medical professor and politician. A full professor at the University of Murcia since 1992, he served as the university's president from 1998 to 2006. As a People's Party politician, he was the mayor of Murcia (2015–2021) and a minister in the Government of the Region of Murcia (2007–2014).

Academic career
Born in Murcia, Ballesta earned bachelor's (1981) and master's (1983) degrees in Medicine and Surgery from the University of Murcia. He then did a post-doctorate with the Royal Postgraduate Medical School at Hammersmith Hospital in London. In 1986 and 1992 respectively, he became an Associate and Full Professor at his alma mater.

He was the Director of the Department of Molecular Biology from 1987 to 1989, and served other internal posts before two terms as President of the University from 1998 to 2006.

In June 2002, King Juan Carlos I awarded Ballesta the Grand Cross of Aeronautical Merit.

Political career
Ballesta was elected to the Regional Assembly of Murcia in the May 2007 elections, but resigned his seat on 6 July. He remained in the regional government as minister in charge of public works, housing and transport.

After the 2011 elections, Ballesta stayed in Ramón Luis Valcárcel's government as Minister of Universities, Business and Research. His role ended when the regional president resigned in April 2014.

With Valcárcel's endorsement as regional PP leader, Ballesta was named as the party's candidate for mayor of Murcia in March 2015. He was invested as mayor in June, by simple majority with 12 of 27 councillors voting in favour of him, after the five from Citizens (Cs) abstained. He gained a second term in 2019, when his ten councillors formed a coalition with the four from Cs.

In March 2021, Cs withdrew their support of Ballesta, and joined the Spanish Socialist Workers' Party (PSOE) in a vote of no confidence, which passed with 15 votes in favour and 14 against replacing him with the PSOE's José Antonio Serrano Martínez. He then returned to his university department.

References

1958 births
Living people
People from Murcia
University of Murcia alumni
Academic staff of the University of Murcia
20th-century Spanish physicians
21st-century Spanish physicians
Spanish molecular biologists
People's Party (Spain) politicians
Members of the Regional Assembly of Murcia
Mayors of places in the Region of Murcia